Josip Šolar (1902 – 1957) was a Yugoslav cyclist. He rode for Ilirija Ljubljana and was Yugoslav National Road Race Champion in 1925. He also competed in the individual and team road race events at the 1928 Summer Olympics.

References

External links
 

1902 births
1957 deaths
Yugoslav male cyclists
Olympic cyclists of Yugoslavia
Cyclists at the 1928 Summer Olympics
Sportspeople from Ljubljana
Slovenian male cyclists